Marta Mateos Adsuara (born 16 October 1984) is a Spanish football striker who most recently played for UD Aldaia CF in Spain's Segunda División. She previously played for Levante UD and Valencia CF in the Primera División.

She ranked among the league's top scorers in the 2008-09 and 2009-10 seasons with 20 and 23 goals, respectively.

Titles
 2 national cups: 2004, 2005 (Levante)

References

1984 births
Living people
Spanish women's footballers
Primera División (women) players
Levante UD Femenino players
Valencia CF Femenino players
Footballers from the Valencian Community
Sportspeople from Castellón de la Plana
Spain women's international footballers
Women's association football forwards
21st-century Spanish women